"Weight of the World" is a song performed by Ringo Starr, released on his 1992 album, Time Takes Time. Written by Brian O'Doherty and Fred Velez, the song was released as a lead single backed with "After All These Years", and "Don't Be Cruel" (the latter was only on the CD single). The single reached 74 in the UK charts. It was released on 28 April 1992 in the US, and on 18 May in the UK.

Track listing
7" single
"Weight of the World" (Brian O'Doherty, Fred Velez) – 3:54
"After All These Years" (Richard Starkey, Johnny Warman) – 3:10

CD single
"Weight of the World" (O'Doherty, Velez) – 3:54
"After All These Years" (Starkey, Warman) – 3:10
"Don't Be Cruel" (Otis Blackwell, Elvis Presley) – 2:08

Chart positions

References
 Footnotes

 Citations

Ringo Starr songs
Song recordings produced by Don Was
1992 singles
1992 songs